Risobinae is a subfamily of the moth family Nolidae.

Genera
Baileya Grote, 1895
Elaeognatha Hampson, 1905
Gigantoceras Holland, 1893 
Risoba Moore, 1881

External links

Risobinae